The following low-power television stations broadcast on digital or analog channel 39 in the United States:

 K39EO-D in Crescent City, California, to move to channel 19
 K39GH-D in Quanah, Texas, to move to channel 20
 K39JC-D in Butte, Montana, to move to channel 34
 KHGS-LD in Glenwood Springs, Colorado, to move to channel 27
 W39CV-D in Minocqua, Wisconsin, to move to channel 35

The following low-power stations, which are no longer licensed, formerly broadcast on digital or analog channel 39:
 K39AG in Ukiah, California
 K39AK in Vernal, Utah
 K39AN-D in New Mobeetie, Texas
 K39BT in Fraser, etc., Colorado
 K39CD in Lake George, Colorado
 K39CR in Eureka, Utah
 K39DG-D in Trinity Center, California
 K39DV in Emery, Utah
 K39DW in Daggett, etc., California
 K39FR in Delta, etc., Utah
 K39GG in Aitkin, Minnesota
 K39GV in Burley, etc., Idaho
 K39IU-D in Springfield, Missouri
 K39JS-D in Salt Lake City, Utah
 K39JU in Jackson, Wyoming
 K39KE-D in Chalfant Valley, California
 K39LV-D in Perryton, Texas
 KENY-LP in Alamosa, Colorado
 KMAH-LP in Cheyenne, Wyoming
 KTRY-LP in Pinedale, Wyoming
 W39AR in Concord, New Hampshire
 W39BP in Pensacola, Florida
 W39CY-D in Myrtle Beach, South Carolina
 W39DE-D in Cayey, Puerto Rico
 WBCF-LD in Florence, Alabama
 WERI-LP in Keysville, Virginia
 WGMU-LP in Burlington, Vermont
 WHUA-LP in Chattanooga, Tennessee
 WMLD-LD in Brownsville, Florida
 WUDM-LD in Wolcott, Indiana
 WWBK-LP in Richmond, Virginia

References

39 low-power